Miopelodytes is an extinct genus of prehistoric frog known from Miocene of Nevada.

See also
 Prehistoric amphibian
 List of prehistoric amphibians

References

Pelodytidae
Prehistoric frogs
Miocene United States
Taxa named by Edward Harrison Taylor
Fossil taxa described in 1941